Peter S. Faucett House, also known as the Hitchens House, is a historic home located at Georgetown, Sussex County, Delaware.  It is an early-19th century, two-story, six-bay, shingled frame dwelling in a vernacular style. It consists of two separate three-bay structures joined to form a single dwelling. It has a two-story rear ell, gable roof, and cross-gable dormer.  It features a variety of Greek Revival, Italianate, and Gothic style design elements.  Also on the property is a contributing frame garage, built between 1910 and 1930.

The site was added to the National Register of Historic Places in 1985.

References

Houses on the National Register of Historic Places in Delaware
Greek Revival houses in Delaware
Gothic Revival architecture in Delaware
Italianate architecture in Delaware
Houses in Georgetown, Delaware
National Register of Historic Places in Sussex County, Delaware